Aye Aye Win is a Burmese journalist.

Aye Aye Win was born in Yangon, Myanmar on 20 December 1953. She is the daughter of journalist U Sein Win, who worked for the Associated Press (AP) for 20 years, advocated for press freedom in Burma, and was sentenced to three terms in prison. In 1979, she graduated from school and was trained in journalism by her father. In 1983, she took her father's phone calls while he was breaking the story of the assassination attempt on South Korean president Chun Doo-hwan.

In 1988, her father moved to the Kyoto News, leaving AP. Win joined the Associated Press in 1989 and was the only female foreign correspondent in Burma at the time. She worked for the Associated Press there for 25 years. She was chief of bureau in Myanmar for AP and during her tenure endured official warnings, surveillance, and threats. She announced her retirement in 2015.

Win was awarded the Associated Press' Gramling Award in 2004, and shared in the Managing Editors' prize in 2008 for the coverage of Cyclone Nargis. In 2008 Win also received the Courage in Journalism Award from the International Women's Media Foundation, who described her as the "axe-handle of the foreign press." She was awarded the Honor Medal for Distinguished Service in Journalism from the Missouri School of Journalism in 2013.

References

External links
Veteran journalist Aye Aye Win on the challenges reporting in Myanmar (interview). Global Journalist. 9 January 2014.

1953 births
Living people
Associated Press reporters
Burmese journalists
People from Yangon
Burmese women journalists
20th-century Burmese women writers
21st-century Burmese women writers
20th-century Burmese writers
21st-century Burmese writers